The Samsung Galaxy Mega is an Android-based phablet that was manufactured and released by Samsung. It was announced on April 11, 2013. The original model featured a  screen, though a revised version was released with a  screen. It has a 1,280×720 screen, a dual-core 1.7 GHz processor and an 8-megapixel camera. The phone runs Android 4.2.2 "Jelly Bean" software, and internal storage is 8 or 16 GB (usable 5.34 or 12 GB respectively).

The Galaxy Mega has received the Android 4.4.2 "KitKat" update. Also available is the unofficial update Cyanogenmod 11 Android 4.4.2 update, for the Mega 6.3 (GT-I9200/I9205). The device's successor is the Samsung Galaxy Mega 2.

Features 
 Multi-window – Split screen capability
 Home Screen is available in landscape mode
 Group Play – Link with other Galaxy devices to share photos or create surround sound using each device's speaker
 Air View – Hover over areas in supported apps to view on-screen previews. (6.3 model in portrait mode only)
 S Memo – Samsung's note app. Create hand-written notes with your finger, text using the keyboard, and embed audio or images.
 S Voice – Personal assistant and knowledge navigator.
 S Translator – Translator app, with support for nine languages.
 Smart Stay – Uses the front-facing camera to track the user's eyes, and only powers off the display if the user is not looking.
 IR blaster (6.3 model)
 Smart dual SIM (5.8 model)

Hardware
The Galaxy Mega largely resembles the Galaxy S4, and the two share similar features. Users can customize the lock screen and quickly access settings from the drop-down notification bar. Other features include Air View, which allows users to preview emails and photos by hovering a finger an inch above the screen, and WatchON, which lets users control a television with the smartphone. It also includes Multi Window, which allows users to use multiple apps on the same screen, a feature that is enhanced with the phone's 6.3-inch LCD (720 x 1280) display. S Translator provides quick and easy translations, and ChatON lets users share their screens with others.

The rear-facing 8-megapixel camera comes with numerous shooting modes such as Panorama and Sound & Shot. The Story Album feature lends itself to quick photo album creation on the go. The Mega runs Android 4.2.2 Jelly Bean. Users can store additional music, photos and videos with up to 64 GB of expandable storage with an external microSD card. A 3,200-mAh removable battery should allow the phone to run throughout the day on a single charge. The Galaxy Mega is powered by a dual-core 1.7-GHz Qualcomm MSM8930 Snapdragon 400 processor with 1.5GB of RAM.

Design
The Galaxy Mega measures 6.6 x 3.46 x 0.31 inches, and is larger than the Samsung Galaxy Note II (5.9 x 3.2 x 0.37 inches), HTC One (2013) (5.1 ounces, 5.31 x 2.63 x 0.28 inches) and Motorola Moto X (1st generation) (4.8 ounces, 5.1 x 2.6 x 0.22-0.4 inches). It weighs 7.1 ounces.

Software 
The Samsung Galaxy Mega runs Android Jelly Bean OS 4.2.2 skinned with Samsung's TouchWiz interface. Samsung's Multi Window Mode is front and center on the device. Similar to other Galaxy phones, you can customize the Mega's lock screen with widgets and shortcuts. Seven customizable home screens are available to the user. 16 quick settings buttons in the notification drawer enable users to toggle features including Wi-Fi connectivity and the proprietary Smart Stay. These buttons can be rearranged by clicking on a tile button in the top right corner of the notification drawer.

The home screen can be viewed horizontally.

Variants 
 GT-I9150 - 5.8-inch screen, 1.4 GHz CPU, 1.5 GB RAM, 8 GB built-in storage - no LTE support - no dual SIM support
 GT-I9152 - 5.8-inch screen, 1.4 GHz CPU, 1.5 GB RAM, 8 GB built-in storage - no LTE support - dual SIM support
 GT-I9200 - 6.3-inch screen, 1.7 GHz CPU, 1.5 GB RAM, 8 GB or 16 GB built-in storage - no LTE support - no dual SIM support
 GT-I9205 - 6.3-inch screen, 1.7 GHz CPU, 1.5 GB RAM, 8 GB or 16 GB built-in storage - LTE support - no dual SIM support
Only the GT-I9152 has dual SIM support.
Only the GT-I9205 has LTE support (i.e. 4G-LTE support) and no FM Radio.
The AT&T version of the GT-I9205 is known as the SGH-i527.

Gallery

See also
 Samsung Galaxy S4
 Samsung Galaxy Note II
 Samsung Galaxy Note 3
 Samsung Galaxy Note 8.0
 Samsung Galaxy Tab 3 8.0

References

External links
 Samsung press release
 Video review by GSM Arena
 Samsung Galaxy Mega Phablet Debuts Information Week

Android (operating system) devices
Samsung mobile phones
Samsung Galaxy
Mobile phones introduced in 2013
Phablets
Mobile phones with infrared transmitter